Walter Whitehurst (7 June 1934 – 20 January 2012) was an English footballer. His regular position was at wing half. He was born in Manchester. He played for Manchester United and Chesterfield.

He died in Blackpool Victoria Hospital, aged 77, after being ill for some time.

References

External links

MUFCInfo.com profile

1934 births
2012 deaths
English footballers
Manchester United F.C. players
Chesterfield F.C. players
Crewe Alexandra F.C. players
Macclesfield Town F.C. players
Ashton United F.C. players
English Football League players
Association football midfielders